Mogolo Subregion is a subregion in the Gash-Barka region of western Eritrea. Its capital lies at Mogolo.

Towns and villages
Aredda
Attai
Chibabo
Mescul
Mogolo

References
Awate.com: Martyr Statistics

Gash-Barka Region
Subregions of Eritrea